Líneas Aéreas Allegro was a scheduled/charter passenger airline from Mexico and US. Allegro Airlines offered 212 domestic and international flights to the U.S. every week.

Company history
Allegro was founded in 1992 by Fernando Padilla, Fernando Martínez, Jose Angel Cardenas, Cap Alejandro J.Martinez, Luis Treviño y Eduardo Alfaro .  It operated scheduled and charter passenger flights from Cancún, Quintana Roo, and Mexico City to points in the United States, Canada, the Caribbean, Central America and South America. The home base was in Monterrey, Nuevo León.

Allegro operated until 2004 when it was ordered by a Phoenix court to return all aircraft to the lessors.

Destinations

Acapulco
Atlanta
Austin/Bergstrom
Boston
Calgary
Cancun
Chicago/O'Hare
Chichen Itza
Cincinnati
Cleveland
Dallas/Fort Worth
Denver
Fargo
Guadalajara
Helena
Kansas City
Liberia
Los Angeles
Louisville
Mexico City
Oakland
Oklahoma City
Philadelphia
Phoenix
Punta Cana
Saint John's
San Francisco
Tampico
Tijuana
Aruba
St Marteen

Fleet details
Operated 25 different Boeing 727-200 throughout its history
Operated 13 different MD-82 and MD-83 throughout its history
Operated 3 different Douglas DC-9-14 throughout its history

Incidents

On 5/14/1996 Allegro flight 401, a chartered DC-9 from Orlando, FL to Cancun, Mexico crashed short of the runway while attempting an emergency landing in Tampico, Mexico. There were no fatalities among the 46 occupants but the plane was damaged beyond repair. 
Accident report

External links
Fleet Data and aircraft picture

References

Defunct airlines of Mexico
Airlines established in 1992
Airlines disestablished in 2004